Boháč (feminine Boháčová) is a Czech surname.

Notable people with this surname include:
 Daniel Boháč, Czech ice hockey player
 Dwayne Bohac, American politician
 Jan Boháč, Czechoslovak canoer
 Josef Boháč, Czech ice hockey player
 Ladislav Boháč, Czechoslovak actor
 Marek Boháč, Czech footballer

See also
 Zsolt Bohács (same pronunciation, Hungarian spelling),  Hungarian canoeist

Czech-language surnames